Newport High School is a co-educational secondary school in the Bettws district of the city of Newport, South Wales, UK for pupils aged 11–18 years.

Admissions
There are about 1,100 pupils from a catchment area to the north western side of Newport.

History
The school's origin can be dated back to the foundation in 1896 of separate Boys' and Girls' intermediate schools in Newport.  Subsequently the High School name was adopted. Following the implementation of comprehensive education the school(s) eventually moved from Queen's Hill to Bettws Lane. The current school of 2009 was built in front of the old Bettws Comprehensive School, itself built in 1970. The latter's school plot was sold to Barratt Homes for demolition and house building.

Academic performance
The school's most recent Estyn inspection took place in 2008. This report was in quick succession to an inspection during November 2007. The 2007 report noted the school's improvements, particularly in GCSE results, since the previous inspection in 2001, but recommended that significant further improvement was necessary.  The 2008 report concluded that "significant improvement" had been made and the school was placed back into the standard inspection cycle.

Alumni

Newport High School for Boys
 Keith Baxter (actor)
 Cyril Bence, Labour MP from 1951 to 1970 for East Dunbartonshire
  Bryan Bowen, Paymaster-in-Chief and Inspector of Army Pay Services from 1986 to 1989, and colonel commandant from 1990 to 1992 of the Royal Army Pay Corps
 Richard Bradshaw, Director General from 1977 to 1981 of the Army Medical Services, and Commandant from 1973 to 1975 of the RAMC Training Centre
 Trevor Brewer, rugby player
 David Burcher, rugby player
 Graham Dixon-Lewis, professor of combustion science from 1978 to 1987 at the University of Leeds
 Gareth L Evans rugby union player
 John Evans (rugby player)
 Raymond Glendenning, sports commentator
 Peter Gray, professor of physical chemistry from 1962 to 1988 at the University of Leeds, master from 1988 to 1996 of Gonville and Caius College, Cambridge, and president from 1983 to 1985 of the Faraday Society
 Donald Harrison, professor of laryngology and otology from 1963 to 1990 at UCL Medical School, and expert on laryngeal cancer
 Walter Martin (rugby player)
 Robert Rowthorn, professor of economics from 1991 to 2006 at the University of Cambridge

Newport High School for Girls
 Margaret Delacourt-Smith, Baroness Delacourt-Smith of Alteryn
 Alison Bielski, poet and writer.

References

External links
 School homepage

Secondary schools in Newport, Wales